Libáň is a town in Jičín District in the Hradec Králové Region of the Czech Republic. It has about 1,900 inhabitants.

Administrative parts
Villages of Kozodírky, Křešice, Psinice and Zliv are administrative parts of Libáň.

Geography
It lies mostly in the Central Elbe Table. The Libáňský Stream flows through the town. There are several ponds around the town, the largest of them is Stejskal.

History
The first written mention of Libáň is from 1340, when it was already referred to as a town.

Economy
The largest employer in Libáň is Antolin Liban, a car parts manufacturer owned by Grupo Antolin. It employs about 750 people.

Sights
The landmark of the town is the Church of the Holy Spirit. It is originally a Gothic church from the 14th century. It was rebuilt in the Baroque style in 1753–1756.

Gallery

References

External links

Cities and towns in the Czech Republic
Populated places in Jičín District